The Cabin Movie is a Canadian comedy-drama film, directed by Dylan Akio Smith and released in 2005. The film centres on a group of friends who try to reignite their lackluster sex lives by renting a cabin in the woods to have an orgy and record it as an amateur porn film.

Plot
Ken (Ryan Robbins) and Maria (Arabella Bushnell), a married couple who have not had sex in a year, decide to invite two other couples to an orgy to spice up their sex lives. However, Mark (Brad Dryborough) and Katherine (Erin Wells) arrive dealing with relationship baggage that complicates their ability to participate, with Mark spending much of the event outside on the deck, while Jason (Ben Cotton) has actually broken up with the girlfriend who was formerly part of the group's circle of friends, and instead arrives with his new love interest Ginny (Justine Warrington), a bisexual woman the rest of the group have never met.

Distribution
The film premiered at the 2005 Toronto International Film Festival. In 2006, it was one of the first Canadian films to be carried by Blockbuster Video in its Festival Collection.

References

External links
 

2005 films
2005 comedy-drama films
2005 LGBT-related films
Canadian comedy-drama films
Canadian sex comedy films
Canadian LGBT-related films
LGBT-related comedy-drama films
Bisexuality-related films
English-language Canadian films
Films shot in British Columbia
2000s English-language films
Films directed by Dylan Akio Smith
2000s Canadian films